1193 Africa, provisional designation , is a stony Eunomian asteroid from the central region of the asteroid belt, approximately 12 kilometers in diameter. It was discovered by South African astronomer Cyril Jackson at Johannesburg Observatory on 24 April 1931. The asteroid was named for the African continent.

Orbit and classification 

Africa is a member of the Eunomia family, a large group of typically S-type asteroids and the most prominent family in the intermediate main-belt. It orbits the Sun at a distance of 2.3–3.0 AU once every 4 years and 4 months (1,572 days). Its orbit has an eccentricity of 0.12 and an inclination of 14° with respect to the ecliptic. The body's observation arc begins with its official discovery observation at Johannesburg.

Physical characteristics

Diameter and albedo 

According to the survey carried out by NASA's Wide-field Infrared Survey Explorer with its subsequent NEOWISE mission, Africa measures 12.22 kilometers in diameter and its surface has an albedo of 0.247. Based on a generic magnitude-to-diameter conversion, Africa measures 13 kilometers in diameter, using an absolute magnitude of 11.8 and a standard albedo for Eunomian asteroids of 0.21, derived from 15 Eunomia, the family's largest member and namesake.

Photometry 

As of 2017, no rotational lightcurve of Africa has been obtained from photometric observations. The body's rotation period, poles and shape still remain unknown.

Naming 

This minor planet was named for Africa, the large continent on which Johannesburg is located. The official naming citation was also mentioned in Paul Herget's The Names of the Minor Planets in 1955.

References

External links 
 Dictionary of Minor Planet Names, Google books
 Asteroids and comets rotation curves, CdR – Observatoire de Genève, Raoul Behrend
 Discovery Circumstances: Numbered Minor Planets (1)-(5000) – Minor Planet Center
 
 

001193
Discoveries by Cyril Jackson (astronomer)
Named minor planets
19310424